Spratticeps is an extinct genus of clupeiform fish which existed in what is now England during the lower Cretaceous period. It contains the species Spratticeps gaultinus.

References

Prehistoric ray-finned fish genera
Cretaceous bony fish
Cretaceous fish of Europe